Trevor Britton (born 23 July 1982) is a cricketer from Derry, Northern Ireland. He is a right-handed batsman and a right-arm off-break bowler. He has participated in List A cricket since 2006. Britton participated in the 2006 EurAsia Cricket Series. He is a middle order batsman.

Current career
He is currently captain of Bready Cricket Club and guided them into the semi finals of the Northern Bank Senior Cup in July 2007 with a remarkable display of spin bowling, taking six wickets for seven runs in 6.5 overs.

External links
Trevor Britton at Cricket Archive

References

1982 births
Living people
Sportspeople from Derry (city)
Cricketers from Northern Ireland